The PokerGO Tour (PGT) is the official tour and ranking system for the world's top professional poker players that play in high roller poker tournaments with a minimum $5,000 buy-in. The PGT celebrates the most elite professional poker players by awarding points based on prize money won in approximately 150 tournaments around the globe.

History 
Launched in April, 2021, the PokerGO Tour was created to reward poker players that played in high roller poker tournaments around the world. The top three finishers would share in $175,000 in prize money, and when residential mortgage company Guaranteed Rate was announced as the presenting sponsor in September, the prize money was increased to $350,000; $200,000 and the Guaranteed Rate Cup for the points leader, $100,000 for second place, and $50,000 for third place.

Following the conclusion of all qualifying PokerGO Tour tournaments for the 2022 season, the top 21 players on the PokerGO Tour leaderboard will be invited to play in the season-ending PGT Championship. Players will have their starting chips based on how many points they earned during the season, and the PGT Championship will be a winner-take-all where the winner will collect the $500,000 first-place prize.

Following the conclusion of all qualifying PokerGO Tour tournaments for the 2023 season, the top 40 players on the PokerGO Tour leaderboard and select "Dream Seat" winners will be invited to play in the season-ending PGT Championship. All players will have their starting chips based on how many points they earned during the season, with the minimum set at 100 big blinds. The PGT Championship will be a $1,000,000 freeroll with a $500,000 first-place prize.

Points system 
The PokerGO Tour calculates all cashes that are less than $1,000,000 in prize money by using three percentages based on buy-in amounts; 0.0010% for $5,000 to $24,999 buy-in events, 0.0006% for $25,000 to $99,999 buy-in events, and 0.0003% for $100,000+ buy-in events. For cashes more than $1,000,000 in prize money, the following points table is used for cashes that fall within structured segments.

Seasons and champions 
The PGT aims to crown the best tournament poker player in the world each year. Players compete throughout the entire year in high-stakes poker tournaments against the toughest competition in the world and are ranked by the PGT leaderboard. Each PGT season there is a season-ending event called the PGT Championship.

In 2021, Ali Imsirovic was crowned the 2021 PGT champion ahead of Michael Addamo and Sean Perry.

In 2022, Stephen Chidwick finished as the 2022 PGT Player of the Year, while Jason Koon won the PGT Championship.

PGT majors 

There are currently four PGT majors. They are the PokerGO Cup, Poker Masters, U.S. Poker Open, and Super High Roller Bowl. The PGT's season-ending event is called the PGT Championship.

PokerGO Cup

Poker Masters 

The Poker Masters was first held in 2017. It was first included in the PGT in 2021 as the PGT launched for that year.

U.S. Poker Open 

The U.S. Poker Open was first held in 2018. It was first included in the PGT in 2021 as the PGT launched for that year.

Super High Roller Bowl

Super High Roller Bowl Europe 

Super High Roller Bowl was first held in 2015. It was first included in the PGT in 2021 as the PGT launched for that year.

Player stats

Top 10 all-time money list 
Information correct as of 24 December 2022.

Top 10 most tournament wins 
Information correct as of January 27, 2023.

Top 10 most cashes 
Information correct as of January 27, 2023.

References 

Poker tournaments
Television shows about poker
Sports organizations established in 2021
Recurring events established in 2021
Organizations based in Nevada